Niño Muhlach (born Angelo José Rocha Muhlach, October 27, 1971) is a Filipino actor. He is the father of Filipino child actor Alonzo Muhlach.

Early life
Niño was born to Alexander Muhlach and Rebecca Rocha, he has five siblings. A nephew of Amalia Fuentes and Álvaro Muhlach, his cousins Aga and Arlene are also actors. He was the owner of D'Wonder Films, which produced most of his films in the 1970s/80s. He was dubbed the "Child Wonder of the Philippines" for making films that garnered both critical and commercial success. He holds the title of highest-paid child actor in the history of Filipino cinema.

He is currently owner of Megamelt Bakeshop, home of Muhlach Ensaymada located at Nicanor Domingo Street corner Mayor Ignacio Santos Díaz Street in the Cubao District of Quezon City.

Personal life
He was married to Edith Millare from 2000–05, they have one child. He has a second child, with Diane Tupaz. He is of Spanish-German-Chinese descent. His son with Diane Tupaz, Alonzo Muhlach, is also an actor.

Filmography

Film
Lulubog Lilitaw sa Ilalim ng Tulay (1974) Chinky Ychavez
Ang Leon at ang Daga (1975) Pongkoy
Harabas con Bulilit (1976)
Kutong Lupa (1976)
Bongbong (1976) Bongbong
Peter Pandesal (1977) Peter
Ang Pagbabalik ni Harabas at Bulilit (1977)
Jack en Poy (1977) Poy
Tutubing Kalabaw Tutubing Karayom (1977)
Amihan at Higibis (1977)
Binata ang Daddy Ko (1977) Dominic
Tahan na Empoy, Tahan (1977) Empoy
Ang Teksas at ang Labuyo (1977) 
Kaming Patok na Patok (1978)
Magkaaway (1978)
Ang Tatay Kong Nanay (1978) – Nonoy
Bruce Liit (1978) Bruce
Butsoy (1978) Butsoy
Isa, Dalawa, Tatlo, ang Tatay Mong Kalbo! (1979)
Kakampi Ko ang Sto. Niño (1979)
Kuwatog (1979) – Kuwatog
Pepeng Kulisap (1979)
Bokyo (1979) Bokyo
Agimat ni Pepe (1979) Pepe
Nognog (1980) Nognog
Juan Tamad Junior (1980) – Juan Tamad Jr.
Hepe (1980) – Hepe
Darna at Ding (1980) – Ding
Enteng-Anting (1980) – Enteng
Tempong (1980) – Tempong
Tropang Bulilit (1981) – Titoy
Mga Batang Sisiw (1981)
Juan Balutan (1982)
Tatlo Silang Tatay Ko (1982)
Roco, ang Batang Bato (1982) – Roco
Cuatro y Medya (1982)
Hula (1983)
D'Godson (1983)
Paano Ba ang Magmahal? (1983)
Nang Maghalo ang Balat sa Tinalupan (1984) – Boboy
Abandonado (1985)
Ma'am May We Go Out? (1985) – Einstein
Like Father, Like Son (1985) – Jonjon
Oks Na Oks Pakner (1986)
Kontra Bandido (1986)
Topo-Topo Barega (1987)
Working Girls 2 (1987)
Pssst Boy... Halika (1988)
Sam en Miguel: No Basura, No Problema (1991) – Angelo
Sonny Boy: Public Enemy Number 1 of Cebu City (1992)
Ronquillo: Tubong Cavite, Laking Tondo (1993) – Bunso
Di Na Natuto?: Sorry Na, Puwede Ba? (1993) – Turing
Buenaventura Daang: Bad Boys Gang (1993)
Swindler's List (1994)
Oo Na, Sige Na! (1994) – Jimbo
Ikaw ang Miss Universe ng Buhay Ko (1994) – Bing
Cuardo de Jack (1994) – Jumbo
Dobol Trobol (1995)
Proboys (1995)
Makamandang Na Bango (1996)
Oki Doki Doc: The Movie (1996) Agent X-44
Wang Wang: Buhay Bombero (1997)
Sanggano (1997) Siano
Buhawi Jack (1998) Dino
Gangland (1998)
Techno Warriors (1998) Bryan
Bilibid or Not (1998)
Markado (1999)
Minsan Ko Lang Sasabihin (2000) Jason
Mahal Kita, Kahit Sino Ka Pa (2001)
One Percent Full (2007) Shaquille
Slumber Party (2011) 
On the Job (2013) Ramon
Juana C the Movie (2013)
Da Possessed (2014)
She's Dating the Gangster (2014)
My Big Bossing (2014)
Resureksyon (2015)
Trip Ubusan: The Lolas vs. Zombies (2017) - Customer man

Television

References

External links 

1971 births
Living people
People from Manila
Filipino male child actors
That's Entertainment (Philippine TV series)
That's Entertainment Thursday Group Members
Filipino people of Chinese descent
Filipino people of German descent
Filipino people of Spanish descent
Niño
Filipino male comedians
ABS-CBN personalities
GMA Network personalities
Filipino male film actors